Cathedral of St. Ignatius of Loyola may refer to:

 , Argentina
 St. Ignatius Cathedral, San Ignacio de Velasco, Bolivia
 St. Ignatius Cathedral, Shanghai, China
 Cathedral of St. Ignatius of Loyola, Vilnius, Lithuania
 Cathedral of St. Ignatius Loyola (Palm Beach, Florida), United States

See also
St. Ignatius Church (disambiguation)